Coproporphyrinogen I is an isomer of coproporphyrinogen III, a metabolic intermediate in the normal biosynthesis of heme. The compound is not normally produced by the human body; its production and accumulation causes a type of porphyria. 

The difference between coproporphyrinogen I and III is the arrangements of the four carboxyethyl ("P" groups) and the four methyl groups ("M" groups).  The I isomer has the sequence MP-MP-MP-MP, whereas in the III isomer it is MP-MP-MP-PM, with the last two side chains reversed.

Biosynthesys
Coproporphyrinogen I is not produced in the normal porphyrin biosynthesis pathway. However, if the enzyme uroporphyrinogen-III cosynthaseis missing or inactive, the compound uroporphyrinogen I is produced instead of uroporphyrinogen III. The enzyme uroporphyrinogen III decarboxylase will also act on the I isomer, producing coproporphyrinogen I:

The reaction entails the conversion of the four carboxymethyl (acetic acid) side chains to methyl groups, with release of four molecules of carbon dioxide.

Unlike the III isomer, coproporphyrinogen I (which is cytotoxic) is not further processed by the body, and accumulates. This situation occurs in the pathological condition called congenital erythropoietic porphyria.

References

Tetrapyrroles